Vincent Charles Pusateri (May 4, 1963 – April 6, 2010), best known by his stage name Vinnie Chas, was an American musician. Born in Honolulu, Hawaii, he moved to Washington State as a child and while growing up there, he went to Bethel High School and was in several bands with childhood friend Jerry Cantrell. In 1987, Chas joined Hollywood-based hard rock band Pretty Boy Floyd as their bassist. He died on April 6, 2010 in Vancouver, Washington, and is laid to rest in Spanaway, Washington.

Discography

With Pretty Boy Floyd
Leather Boyz With Electric Toyz - (1989)
The Vault - (2002)
Tonight Belongs to the Young Remastered demos - (2003)
The Demos Collection - (2003)
The Vault 2 - (2003)
Dirty Glam - (2004)
The Greatest Collection - The Ultimate Pretty Boy Floyd - (2004)

With Rattlin' Bones
 Rattlin' Bones (1995)

References

External links
 Vinnie Chas MySpace Page
 Official Pretty Boy Floyd website
 Pretty Boy Floyd MySpace Page

2010 deaths
American rock bass guitarists
American male bass guitarists
1963 births
20th-century American bass guitarists
20th-century American male musicians